No Contest II is a 1996 action film starring Shannon Tweed, Bruce Payne and Lance Henriksen. It is a sequel to No Contest.

Plot

Erich Dengler (Lance Henriksen), the son of Manferd Dengler (a prominent Nazi during the rule of Adolf Hitler in Germany), poses as an Art Collector, Eric Dane, in order to take over the Holman Museum to retrieve a shipment of nerve gas that has been hidden in some art work. He holds the occupants of the museum, including Sharon Bell (Shannon Tweed) and film director Jack Terry (Bruce Payne), who are looking for a good location to shoot a film, hostage. Dengler attempts to unleash a lethal nerve gas bomb which threatens the safety of the world.  His plan is to sell the rest of the nerve gas to the highest bidder. Jack and Sharon make it their business to stop him.

Cast

Lance Henriksen as Eric Dane / Erich Dengler
Shannon Tweed as Sharon Bell
Bruce Payne as Jack Terry
Jayne Heitmeyer as Bobbi Bell
Jeffrey Max Nicholls as Steven Ivory
Joseph Griffin as Reggie
David Keeley as Ritter
Kevin Jubinville as Falco
Sky Gilbert as Beagle
Fiona Highet as Lisette
Barbara Chilcott as Mrs. Holman
Falconer Abraham as Jarvis
Hamish McEwan as Binsey
Sophie Simmons as Little Girl Rose
Tommy Chang as Kidnapper

Reception

One reviewer stated that the sequel had a 'slightly darker tone' than No Contest and was less enjoyable. Similarly, a different reviewer commented that 'what this film does best is remind you how good the first film was'. Another reviewer stated that 'the vast majority of the movie is standard Die Hard stuff'. A different reviewer commented that 'it gets the job done but it's not the best'. Edmond Grant described the film as 'straightforward' and a 'female twist on Die Hard (1988)'. Similarly, Owen Williams of Empire described the film as Die Hard 'in a museum'. Mick Martin and Marsha Porter described the film as an 'unimaginative, derivative thriller'. Jim McLellan stated that 'if you don’t look too hard, this is still passably entertaining, with the art gallery providing an interesting location for some battles (the cat-fight between Sharon and Dane’s henchwoman comes to mind, ending on a piece of unfortunately-pointy artwork)'. McLellan contended that 'Henriksen is good value as ever in the psycho role, e.g. shooting people because they can’t deliver Shakespeare to his liking and, while Payne is better known as a villain, he does decent work here in a more sympathetic role'. However, McLellan thought that the film did not use them effectively and that the film needed 'to be less obviously stage-managed towards its conclusion, which is obvious well before it happens'.

References

External links

1996 films
1996 action films
American action films
Films directed by Paul Lynch
1990s English-language films
1990s American films